St George's Gardens is a public park in the King's Cross area of the former parish and borough of St Pancras, in the London Borough of Camden.

History
Its land was originally bought in 1713 to provide a joint burial ground for St George's Bloomsbury and St George the Martyr, Holborn; however the site chosen was in neither Bloomsbury or Holborn as there wasn't a suitable site available in either of those areas. Instead, the parishes sited their burial ground in the parish of St Pancras. This was one of the first burial grounds in London to be sited away from the church or churches it served. 

The burial ground was formerly known as Nelson's Burial Ground a "Pious and learned writer" who was the first to be buried there. The burial ground closed due to overcrowding in 1855, reopening as a public garden around 1885.

It was Grade II* listed on 1 October 1987.

References

Grade II* listed parks and gardens in London
Bloomsbury
Former cemeteries